"The Seduction of Kansas" is a song by American punk rock band, Priests. The track was the title track from their second studio album, The Seduction of Kansas. The track was released as a single on January 19, 2019.

Background 
The song is the self-titled lead single for their second studio album, and was released on January 9, 2019, nearly two years after their debut album. 

In an interview with Stereogum the band bickered about naming the title of the song. Katie Alice Greer when describing whether the song or title came first, the song title was decided on after the song was written and record. Greer said "we didn’t decide on the album until the 11th hour, when it was like, “You guys have to pick a fucking title.” We were going through so many options". Other potential options for the song title included "All Hat, No Cattle", and "Horny For War, Horny For Sadness".

Music video 
Lead singer, Katie Alice Greer, directed the music video, which was released with the single on January 9, 2019. Marissa Lorusso, writing for NPR praised the music video saying it's a reminder of what makes the band's sharp, cerebral music so exciting".

Critical reception 
Writing for Consequence of Sound, Randall Coburn called the track "shinier and more synth-driven than much of their earlier work, but maintains an anxious undercurrent that pairs well with vocalist Katie Alice Greer’s boundless energy and vibrant lyricism (“Bloodthirsty cherub choir/ from the cornfields you sing to me”).

Quinn Moreland in an interview with the band, and writing for Pitchfork described the track as "a side of Priests that is frequently overshadowed by all the “political punk” branding". Moreland described the song as more "pop sheen" to its sound.

References 

2019 singles
2019 songs
Priests (band) songs
Song recordings produced by John Congleton
Songs about Kansas